Setogyroporus is a fungal genus in the family Boletaceae. It is a monotypic genus, containing the single species Setogyroporus Verus.

References

Boletaceae
Monotypic Boletales genera